Sinococuline is a bioactive alkaloid found in Cocculus trilobus.

References

Piperidine alkaloids
Morphinans